The USWA Unified World Heavyweight Championship was a professional wrestling world heavyweight championship formed in 1988, which consisted of the WCWA World Heavyweight Championship from World Class Championship Wrestling and the AWA World Heavyweight Championship from the American Wrestling Association. The title was unified on December 13, 1988, when AWA World Champion Jerry Lawler defeated WCWA World Champion Kerry Von Erich in a unification match.

The title was primarily recognized by and defended in the United States Wrestling Association until 1997, when the company ceased operations. However, the AWA withdrew its recognition of the championship shortly after the unification match when Lawler was stripped of the AWA world title. The title was also contested in a non-televised match prior to the World Wrestling Federation's King of the Ring event in 1993.

Title history

Combined reigns

Footnotes

References

Recurring sporting events established in 1988
Recurring events disestablished in 1997
United States Wrestling Association championships
World heavyweight wrestling championships